Mondello Park is Ireland's only international motorsport venue and is located in Caragh, County Kildare off the R409 regional road, approximately  from Dublin city centre.

History
The Mondello Park short circuit was designed on farmland near Naas in Co Kildare by Stuart Cosgrave in 1966, following the demise of the Dunboyne motor races on traditional and dangerous roads in Co Meath. The circuit opened in 1968, and was extended via the National Loop the following year. Well-known Irish drivers such as Derek Daly, David Kennedy, Tommy Byrne and Eddie Jordan cut their teeth on the circuit in the 1970s and early 1980s, going on to international fame, but financial difficulties emerged thereafter.

Mondello was purchased by businessman Martin Birrane with the Royal Irish Automobile Club in 1986, and Birrane bought the facility outright one year later once the scale of investment became clear. Subsequent upgrades included FIA certification and pit garages with hospitality and conferencing facilities above, along with a museum that features significant cars from international motorsport history including a Jordan 194 and Jordan EJ14, several Lola Cars examples reflecting Birrane's ownership of the marque, machinery that ten-times Le Mans driver Birrane raced in period, and other items of motorsport history. 

Notable Leinster Trophy winners at Mondello include thrice F1 world champion Ayrton Senna (then known as Ayrton da Silva) in 1982, F1 race winners John Watson, Mika Hakkinen and Takuma Sato; and Jordan Grand Prix founder Eddie Jordan during his driving career.

Guest appearances and demonstration runs at Mondello include those by Jordan driver Damon Hill as guest of honour, World Rally Champion Carlos Sainz in his Toyota Corolla World Rallycar, and David Kennedy shaking down a Jordan Mugen-Honda 199 in 1999, broadcast on RTÉ during a season that marked Jordan's most successful campaign while Northern Irish driver Eddie Irvine challenged for the Formula One World Drivers' Championship, marking a high-point for Irish motorsport on the international stage.

The 2000s marked the most high profile time for the Irish Circuit, as Domestic series from Great Britain came over to Mondello Park every year. These included the British Touring Car Championship which ran from 2001–2006, the British GT Championship from 2004–2006 and the British Superbike Championship which ran from 2003–2007 where Jonathan Rea took his first ever BSB win in the last ever race at the circuit. Mondello Park also hosted around of the FIA Sportscar Championship in 2001.

Mondello Park is now owned by Birrane's family following his death in 2018.

Events

Currently, Irish Car Championship, Rallycross, kart and Dunlop Masters Superbike Championship racing events take place. In the past Mondello Park hosted the Irish round of the British Superbike Championship, British Touring Car Championship, British GT Championship and the British Formula Three Championship. International Pickup Truck Racing, FIA Sportscar Championship, EuroBOSS and historic car racing events also have taken place.

The biggest Irish circuit racing events, Formula Vee Festival and Leinster Trophy, take place in Mondello Park every year.

Other recurring motorsport events include drifting championship, Jap-Fest, Ireland's only Japanese car show, Historic Festival, historic car show and racing event. Mondello Park Racing School is on-site. General public car and motorbike circuit track days are organised. A small museum containing a number of rally and track cars from the past 30 or so years is also on-site.

The 2019 motor racing season at Mondello Park consisted of car racing days, 6 rallycross racing days, 7 drift days and 26 motorcycle racing days. Formula Vee Festival took place on 13–14 July, and Leinster Trophy on 14–15 September.

In the 2020 motor racing season Mondello Park had plans to host 16 car racing days, 7 rallycross racing days, 12 drift days and 14 motorbike racing days, however, the calendar was disrupted by COVID-19 pandemic restrictions. 

In 2021 Mondello Park signed a 5-year deal to promote and organise Irish Circuit Racing. In past years, various Irish Motor Clubs shared this task. Irish Circuit Racing consisted of 5 two-day events in 2021. Mondello Park has also hosted 5 rounds of Rallycross, 5 rounds of Rallysprint, Fiesta Endurance Race, and a number of motorbike racing days in 2021.

The circuit
It was established in 1968. Following investment and development in 1999–2000, the circuit was awarded FIA International status in 2001.

Situated on 110 acres the facility incorporates  of race track, 24 race garages and 12 Hospitality Suites. It is host to National and International Race events, Motor Shows, Car & Bike Track days, Training Schools and Corporate Events.

The Circuit also has 3 km of extreme off-road driving trails and a 5-acre off-road activities centre and the Museum of Motorsport.

Lap records

The official race lap records at the Mondello Park are listed as:

Layout configurations 

The "Reverse Circuit" has also been used as a variation in National and Rallycross configurations.

Simulation / Video Game
This racetrack appears in the videogames Need For Speed: Pro Street, CarX: Drift Racing Online, GT Legends and TOCA Race Driver 3.

It is also available for Assetto Corsa as third-party content through the official laser scanning of the present layout, or a made-from-scratch recreation of the track in its 1987 form.

Notes

References

External links
Official Homepage

1968 establishments in Ireland
FIA Grade 4 circuit
Motorsport venues in the Republic of Ireland
Sports venues in County Kildare